Salvador Kaçaj (born 23 October 1967) is a retired Albanian football player. Kaçaj has a legal degree as well as a business degree that he earned by attending University in New York. He was presented with the title "Master of the sport" and decorated with "Gold Medal". Kaçaj is now married with four children.

Club career
Kaçaj began playing football in Albania with the club Besëlidhja Lezhë, and moved to Greece in 1991. After one season in the Greek third division with Kallithea F.C., he joined Athinaikos F.C. in the Greek first division for two seasons.

After three seasons in Cyprus with AC Omonia, he returned to Greece to play for Levadiakos F.C. in the Greek second division.

International career
He made his debut for Albania in a September 1991 friendly match against Greece and earned a total of 18 caps, scoring 1 goal. His final international was a June 1997 FIFA World Cup qualification match away against Portugal.

Post football career
In May 2011, Kaçaj was elected town mayor of Shëngjin, a small touristic coastal town situated in Lezhë District.

References

External links

1967 births
Living people
People from Lezhë
Association football midfielders
Albanian footballers
Albania international footballers
Besëlidhja Lezhë players
KF Skënderbeu Korçë players
Kallithea F.C. players
Athinaikos F.C. players
Olympiakos Nicosia players
AC Omonia players
Levadiakos F.C. players
KF Vllaznia Shkodër players
Super League Greece players
Cypriot First Division players
Albanian expatriate footballers
Expatriate footballers in Greece
Albanian expatriate sportspeople in Greece
Expatriate footballers in Cyprus
Albanian expatriate sportspeople in Cyprus
Mayors of places in Albania